

Archosaurs

Newly named basal archosauromorphs

Newly named non-avian dinosaurs

Synapsids

References